York Township is one of the twenty townships of Darke County, Ohio, United States. The 2010 census found 503 people in the township.

Geography
Located in the northern part of the county, it borders the following townships:
Wabash Township - north
Patterson Township - northeast
Wayne Township - southeast
Richland Township - south
Brown Township - southwest
Allen Township - northwest

No municipalities are located in York Township.

Name and history
One of ten York Townships statewide, it is named after a farmer, Newberry York, who lived on Indian Creek in the township, and who was the first local Justice of the Peace. Born near Wrightsboro, Georgia on September 6, 1784, York served in the War of 1812 before moving to Darke County. He and his family first settled in Wayne Township before moving to what became York Township.

York Township was established in 1837 from land given by Richland Township.

Government
The township is governed by a three-member board of trustees, who are elected in November of odd-numbered years to a four-year term beginning on the following January 1. Two are elected in the year after the presidential election and one is elected in the year before it. There is also an elected township fiscal officer, who serves a four-year term beginning on April 1 of the year after the election, which is held in November of the year before the presidential election. Vacancies in the fiscal officership or on the board of trustees are filled by the remaining trustees.  The current trustees are Bill Barga, Michael Mangen, and James Zumbrink, and the clerk is Allen Brandt.

References

External links
County website

Townships in Darke County, Ohio
Townships in Ohio